Torsten Schack Pedersen (born 26 June 1976 in Farsø) is a Danish politician, who is a member of the Folketing for the Venstre political party. He was elected into parliament at the 2005 Danish general election.

Political career
Pedersen served as Chairman of Venstres Ungdom 2001–2003. He was elected into parliament at the 2005 election, and was reelected in 2007, 2011, 2015 and 2019.

References

External links 
 Biography on the website of the Danish Parliament (Folketinget)

1976 births
Living people
People from Vesthimmerland Municipality
Venstre (Denmark) politicians
Members of the Folketing 2005–2007
Members of the Folketing 2007–2011
Members of the Folketing 2011–2015
Members of the Folketing 2015–2019
Members of the Folketing 2019–2022
Members of the Folketing 2022–2026